Andrej Hočevar (born November 21, 1984) is a Slovenian ice hockey goaltender. He participated at the 2011 IIHF World Championship as a member of the Slovenia men's national ice hockey team.

References

External links

1984 births
Living people
HDD Olimpija Ljubljana players
Slovenian ice hockey goaltenders
Sokil Kyiv players
Sportspeople from Ljubljana